The 2015–16 season was Al-Talaba Sports Club's 41st consecutive season in the Iraqi Premier League, the top-flight of Iraqi football. Having finished in 5th of Group 2 in the previous season, and having withdrawn from the Iraq FA Cup, Al-Talaba only competed in the Iraqi Premier League.

In the first stage of the league, Al-Talaba were inconsistent in their results, finishing in 4th place of the Group 1 table at 27 points with seven wins, six draws, four losses and a goal difference of +6. In the second stage, Al-Talaba lost their first match against Al-Shorta and before clinching a win against Al-Quwa Al-Jawiya. After drawing with the league leaders, Al-Zawra'a and the defending champions, Naft Al-Wasat, they won against Al-Mina'a which could have led them from 3rd to 2nd before drawing the next match with Al-Naft. They won their last match against Baghdad to remain in their position of 3rd in the league after three wins, three draws, a loss, at 12 points.

Kit

Players

Squad information

On loan

Players In

Players Out

Technical staff

Statistics

Top scorers

Captains

Penalties

Friendlies

Competitions

Overall record

Iraqi Premier League

Group stage

Results by round

Matches

Last updated: 3 March 2016Source: Kooora

Final stage

Results by round

Matches

Last updated: 21 May 2016Source: Kooora

References

Sport in Baghdad
Al Talaba seasons
Al-Talaba SC
Al Talaba